GIM or Gim may refer to:
Goa Institute of Management, an Indian Business School
Gruppe Internationale Marxisten, a Trotskyist group
Guided Imagery and Music, a technique used in music therapy
Gim (food), a Korean-style laver
Gim (sword), long used in China
Ğīm, the fifth letter of the Arabic alphabet
Kim (Korean name) or Gim, a Korean surname
GIM mechanism, a mechanism in quantum field theory
Moluccan Evangelical Church, (Geredja Indjili Maluku), the Netherlands
Gīm, the Arabic letter

People with the given name
 Gim Allon, a character in the DC Comics universe

Surname
Cen (surname) romanized Gim sometimes